NASE may refer to:

Organisations
National Academy of Scuba Educators-NASE Worldwide
Network for Astronomy School Education - NASE

Biology
Neretvan nase (Chondrostoma knerii)
Minnow-nase (Chondrostoma phoxinus)
Common nase (Chondrostoma nasus)
Iberian nase (Pseudochondrostoma polylepis)
South-west European nase (Parachondrostoma toxostoma)
Kuban nase (Chondrostoma kubanicum)
Terek nase (Chondrostoma oxyrhynchum)
Colchic nase (Chondrostoma colchicum)
Kura nase (Chondrostoma cyri)
South European nase (Protochondrostoma genei)

Magazine
Naše novine- magazine from Subotica in Bačka

Music
Balkansko a naše-the fourth solo, studio album by Bosnian rapper Edo Maajka
Sanjala sam naše venčanje - the first studio album by Serbian singer Dragana Mirković.
Naše Věc - Czech hip hop band

See also

NASA (disambiguation)
NESA (disambiguation)